This is a complete list of ice hockey players who were drafted in the National Hockey League Entry Draft by the San Jose Sharks franchise. It includes every player who was drafted, regardless of whether they played for the team. The Sharks came into existence in 1991 when the NHL expanded into northern California as a compromise to the owners of the Minnesota North Stars, who wanted to relocate the team into the area.

Key
 Played at least one game with the Sharks
 Spent entire NHL career with the Sharks

Draft picks
Statistics are complete as of the 2021–22 NHL season and show each player's career regular season totals in the NHL.  Wins, losses, ties, overtime losses and goals against average apply to goaltenders and are used only for players at that position.

See also
1991 NHL Dispersal and Expansion Drafts

References
General

Specific

draft
 
San Jose Sharks